Zvole may refer to the following places in the Czech Republic:

 Zvole (Prague-West District)
 Zvole (Šumperk District)
 Zvole (Žďár nad Sázavou District)